Tyloderma is a genus of hidden snout weevils in the family Curculionidae. There are at least 30 described species in this genus.

Species
The genus consists of the following species:

 Tyloderma aeneotinctum Champion, 1905
 Tyloderma aereoides Wibmer, 1981
 Tyloderma aereum (Say, 1831)
 Tyloderma angustulum Casey, 1892
 Tyloderma aquaticum Wibmer, 1981
 Tyloderma baridium LeConte, 1876
 Tyloderma californicum Wibmer, 1981
 Tyloderma capitale Wibmer, 1981
 Tyloderma capitaloides Wibmer, 1981
 Tyloderma caseyi Wibmer, 1981
 Tyloderma circumcaribbeum Wibmer, 1981
 Tyloderma contusum Casey, 1892
 Tyloderma foveolatum (Say, 1831)
 Tyloderma fragariae (Riley, 1871) (strawberry crown borer)
 Tyloderma laporteae Wibmer, 1981
 Tyloderma lecontei Wibmer, 1981
 Tyloderma marshalli Wibmer, 1981
 Tyloderma minimum Blatchley, 1920
 Tyloderma morbillosum (LeConte, 1857)
 Tyloderma myriophylli Wibmer, 1981
 Tyloderma neomorbillosum Wibmer, 1981
 Tyloderma nigrum Casey, 1884
 Tyloderma oenotherae Wibmer, 1981
 Tyloderma pseudaereum Wibmer, 1981
 Tyloderma pseudofoveolatum Wibmer, 1981
 Tyloderma punctatum Casey, 1884
 Tyloderma rufescens Casey, 1892
 Tyloderma sphaerocarpae Wibmer, 1981
 Tyloderma subpubescens Casey, 1892
 Tyloderma variegatum (Horn, 1873)

References

 Alonso-Zarazaga, Miguel A., and Christopher H. C. Lyal (1999). A World Catalogue of Families and Genera of Curculionoidea (Insecta: Coleoptera) (Excepting Scotylidae and Platypodidae), 315.
 Poole, Robert W., and Patricia Gentili, eds. (1996). "Coleoptera". Nomina Insecta Nearctica: A Check List of the Insects of North America, vol. 1: Coleoptera, Strepsiptera, 41-820.

Further reading

 Arnett, R. H. Jr., M. C. Thomas, P. E. Skelley and J. H. Frank. (eds.). (21 June 2002). American Beetles, Volume II: Polyphaga: Scarabaeoidea through Curculionoidea. CRC Press LLC, Boca Raton, Florida .
 Arnett, Ross H. (2000). American Insects: A Handbook of the Insects of America North of Mexico. CRC Press.
 Richard E. White. (1983). Peterson Field Guides: Beetles. Houghton Mifflin Company.

External links

 NCBI Taxonomy Browser, Tyloderma

Cryptorhynchinae
Curculionidae genera
Taxa named by Thomas Say